The Rich Khan Badma is a Buryat folktale, first collected by Buryat ethnographer and folklorist . The tale is related to the theme of the calumniated wife and classified in the Aarne-Thompson-Uther Index as type ATU 707, "The Three Golden Children". Similar tales are found among other Mongolic peoples, sharing some of its motifs.

Source
According to Russian scholarship, the tale was recorded in Balagansk.

Summary
Tsar/Khan Badma lives in a grand and splendid palace with three wives, the third named Намту-харакшин (Namtu Haraksin). On one occasion, Badma asks his three wives what they will give him when he returns from a journey; the elder wives promise to sew him a new coat, while the third wife saying she will bear him a son with golden chest and silver backside. Badma rides to the Altai Mountains and returns home. The jealous cowives replace the boy for a black puppy and cast him in the sea. Badma admonishes his third wife. The next time he has to go on a journey,  Namtu Haraksin promises to give birth to another boy with golden chest and silver backside. Once again, the jealous cowives replace the boy for a black puppy and cast him in the sea. Badma has to go on another journey, and Namtu Haraksin gives birth to another boy with golden chest and silver backside who she "hides in her sleeve", while the cowives place a puppy in its place. After Badma sees the third puppy, he orders the wife to be sewn in a bull's hide, put in a barrel and for the barrel to be thrown in the sea.

Namtu Haraksin and her third child pray to the gods to be rescued and the gods make the barrel wash ashore in a beach. With magical powers, the boy creates a palace for him and his mother. Some time later, the "three riders of Tomo Ula" visit the city by ship on the way to Badma Khan and a little yellow dog (Namtu Haraksin's son in disguise) appears to them. The boy becomes a fly and follows the ship. The riders meet Badma Khan and tell him about the palace on the island, but Badma's cowives tell them about an evergreen birch tree with 70 nests of birds that sing all year; then about the king of boars, Хадарган (Hadargan), which ploughs the land with its tusks while his subjects harvest the grains to make alcoholic drinks; and lastly about two boys that live in an iron palace on the other side of the Black Sea who play with the mountains and are guarded by a black dog. Namtu Haraksin's son gets the birch tree and the boar, and decides to get the two boys. His mother prepares two cakes with her breastmilk for the journey. In the iron palace, the two boys eat the cakes with breastmilk and recognize it as their mother's. Their brother appears and takes them to Namtu Haraksin, their mother.

After the brothers are reunited with their mother, they decide to visit Khan Badma. On the way, they light a fire on the road. Khan Badma sees the light in the distance and sends a messenger to invite the strangers to his palace. The three brothers and Namty-Karaksin enter the palace and the brothers announce the intention of their visit: to know their father, Khan Badma. The khan rejoices that he found his sons and his wife, and punishes the elder co-wives for their evil deed.

Analysis

Tale type
The tale is classified in the international Aarne-Thompson-Uther Index as tale type ATU 707, The Three Golden Children.

Folklorist  listed "Богатый царь Бадма" as a Buryat variant of tale type 707. In the same vein, European folklorists Johannes Bolte and Jiri Polívka listed Der reiche König Badma ("The Rich King Badma") as a Buryat variant of the German tale The Three Little Birds, collected by the Brothers Grimm.

Hungarian orientalist László L. Lőrincz established the classification of the Mongolian tale corpus. In his system, the international type ATU 707 corresponds to types 138A and 138B, titled Die Gattin, die einen Welpen geboren hat ("The Queen who gave birth to puppies"). Folklorist  stated that the tale type was "widespread" in Turkic-Mongolian traditions.

Motifs
According to Erika Taube, in Turkic-Mongolian variants of type 707, the number of the khan's wives may vary (none, at first; or 1, 2, 3, 12 and even 108). Also, the number of children (a son, two sons, a son and daughter pair or three sons), all born with special attributes (golden chest, silver backside, or legs of gold or silver), will vary, depending on the version.

According to Russian folklorist , in tales from the Mongolic peoples, the promised wonder children are described to have a golden chest, often combined with a silver backside.

Russian scholarship has noted that in Buryat tales and üligers, children born with golden breast and silver backside often show supernatural abilities and functions akin to a cultural hero. They appear in tales classified as type 707, as well in other unrelated types.

Variants

Mongolia
Professor Charles R. Bawden provided the summary of a Mongolian variant he titled In the King's Absence. In this tale, a king with three queens goes on a journey. Each of the three queens promise a grand feat when he returns: the first to create a seamless pair of boots, the second to sew a shirt with a louse skin, and the third to give birth to a son "with breast of gold and buttocks of silver". Each of them accomplishes what they promised, but the boy's birth wakens feeling of envy in the other two. Tricking the third queen, the two envious ones give the baby for a cow to eat. The king returns and, seeing that no son was born, blinds the third queen, cuts off her hand, breaks a leg and exiles her with the cow. The cow gives birth to the boy. The two queens feign illness and want the liver of a boy with golden breast and silver buttocks. At the end of the tale, the boy and the queen tell the whole story to the king.

Professor B. Rintchen collected an epic titled Khan Tschingis from a local Mongol bard named Onoltu. Rintchen published this epic in his book of Khalka Mongol texts. He noticed in his analysis that its "central theme" was The Calumniated Wife: in the story, the queen promises to give birth to a boy "with breast of gold and buttocks of silver" (altan čegejǐtei mōnggün bōgsetei).

Another tale was collected by professor Yasuhiro Yamakoshi from a Mrs. Dogarmaa, in Hulunbuir, in 2005. In this tale, in the Shinekhen Buryat language, A Boy with a Golden Breast and Silver Buttocks, before a king goes to war, he asks his three wives what they will do for him when he returns. The third answers she will give birth to a boy with golden breast and silver buttocks. Just before their husband returns, the other two wives hide the fabled boy to shame the third queen. The king returns and, since he does not see his promised son, banishes the third queen. Later, he discovers that his son was hidden under the sill, and makes peace with the third wife.

In a late 19th article, Russian ethnographer Grigory Potanin recalled a similar tale he had heard from  a Khalkha Mongol source. In this tale, about "the three wives of Bergen-Mejit" (Бэгэр-Меджит), the third wife of Bergen-Mejit promises her husband to give birth to a child of wondrous aspect while he is away on a hunt. The jealous co-wives take the boy as soon as he is born, lock him up in a series of boxes (a golden one, a silver one, an iron one and a wooden one), then bury the box under the sill. The boy tries to make his presence known, to the co-wives' horror, so they dig up the box and throw it in the sea. The box is found by someone, the boy is saved and returns later to his father's house to denounce the co-wives' deceit.

Buryat people
In a tale from the Buryat titled "Младшая ханша и ее Златогрудый сын" or "Хаанай бага хатан Алтан сээжэтэй хубуун хоёр" ("The youngest princess and her golden-breasted son"), a khan with two wives decides to marry a third time. One day, before going to war, he asks what his wives will present him upon his return; the third promises to give birth to a boy with golden breast and silver backside. The jealous co-wives throw the boy to the dogs, but he returns later to his father's court and tells his mother's story.

In another tale, "Жагар Мэшэд хан" ("Jagar Meshed Khan"), a powerful khan has three wives. Before he goes to war, the third one promises him a son with golden breast and silver behind. The other two queens become jealous, replace the boy for a puppy and bury him under the palace doors. The khan returns and tries to open the door, so he announces he will beat the drums to summon his people, but the two queens dissuade him. That night, they exhume the boy's remains and throw it in a deep well. Some time later, the khan takes his gray horse to drink from the well. The man notices something wrong with the well and decides to summon workers to dig up the well. The queens dig up the bones, grind them to powder and feed to a cow. The animal gives birth to a calf with coral horns, golden chest and silver behind, which becomes the khan's pet. The jealous queens notice the calf and order a servant to take it to the mountains to kill it, but the animal escapes. Some time later, a young man in rags appears at the khan's court and tells him the whole story. Not believing the youth's words, the khan shoots an arrow at him. The arrow does not harm him, and the youth takes off his rags to show his golden breast, which confirms he is the khan's son.

Kalmyk people
Russian scholarship noted that in tales from the Kalmyk people, tale type 707 appears as continuation of tale type 313H, "The Magic Flight" (subtype with siblings). In one example, "Ьурвн кууктэ эмгн евгн хойр" ("An old man and old woman who had three daughters"), the elderly couple abandon their three daughters in the woods. The sisters meet a malevolent person in the woods and escape through the use of magical objects. The khan finds them and marries the sister who promises to bear the wondrous children with golden breast and golden braids, events that also happen in another Kalmyk variant, "Эгч-дY hурвн" ("Three Sisters").

In other tales, the wonder children are born with golden breast and silver backside. For example, in the tale "О девушке, ставшей царицей, и о ее одиннадцати сыновьях" ("About the Girl who became a queen and her 11 sons"), girl Badma wears feminine clothes at home, but disguises herself as a youth when grazing with the herd. One day, a creature named mus breaks into her house and devours her parents, but she escapes with the help of a horse. Now orphan, she employs herself to a local khan still disguised as male, but the khan tries to reveal her female identity. After some attempts, her magical horse convinces her to tell her story to the khan, who falls in love with Badma. The khan expels his previous 500 Shulma wives and marries the girl. The next year, war erupts, and the khan departs with his wife's magical horse to fight, while she stays and gives birth to eleven sons with golden breast and silver backside. The previous Shulma wives intercept a letter and falsify it to tell the khan his wife gave birth to 11 puppies. The khan orders Badma and her elder son to be cast into the sea in a barrel. Their barrel washes ashore on an island. Badma's magical horse finds its rider and, to help her, the horse begs to be sacrificed and its remains to be distributed nearby. Saddened, they follow through with the instructions, and wake up in a white, carpeted kibitka. Later, the elder son shapeshifts into a sparrow to spy on his father's court, where the previous 500 Shulma wives comment on strange wonders: a beautiful woman that comes out of the water, and on a certain beach 10 youths with golden breast and silver backside come out of the sea to eat food on their golden plates.

In another Kalmyk tale, "Кевун бээдлтэ куукн" ("Сказка про девушку с мужским поведением" or "Девушка, похожая на юношу"; "A girl dressed as a boy"), the titular heroine shows great skills at hunting and horse-riding, wearing masculine clothes when taking the herd to graze. One day, she reaches the estate of a khan, who tries to unmask her. The second part of the tale continues as tale type 707.

According to researcher B. B. Goryaeva, in another Buryat tale titled  "Педрəч хан" ("Pedrech Khan"), the third sister promises to bear twins, a boy with golden chest and a girl with silver backside.

Soyot people
Potanin also republished a tale collected by G. Adrianov in Mongolia with the title "Кэрэк-Кирвэс-Хэмэрэ-мэргэн" or "Хэрэкъ-Кирвэсъ Хэмрэ мергенъ" ("Kerek-Kirves-Khemere-mergen"). In this tale, a man named Ароибай-Его-хан (Arolbai-Ego-khan) is married to two wives, the oldest promises to sew him a silken robe, boots and a sable hat, while his youngest wife promises to bear him a bogatyr son. The younger wife begins to have strange dreams about her husband, and consults with the older wife about it, who is already in the process of sewing the garments. As the boy's birth approaches, the older wife begins to worry and conspires with an old servant to replace the boy for a puppy as soon as he is born. So it happens: the older wife assists the younger's wife labour and takes the boy. The elder servant advises to throw the boy in the steppe, so that he is trampled under the hooves of a wild animal. Whenever they hope for an animal to trample him (first, a black stallion; second, wild camels; third, sheep), the boy leaves unscathed, so they decide to throw him in the lake (a golden lake named Altyn-Kul). As for his younger wife, Arolbai-Ego-khan orders that she is to be blinded in one eye, have a hand cut off and banished from his kingdom into the wilderness. In the wilderness, the woman sees a mouse and a bird forage for a herb with healing properties and uses it on herself. She also sees a boy that comes out of the lake and plays near the shore. She captures the boy, who wants her to prove their parentage, so she shoots jets of breastmilk that fall into the boy's mouth. They begin to live together near the lake, and the boy becomes a hunter, hunting larger game as times goes by. The khan sends ambassadors to check on some mysterious happenings around the lake and report their findings to the khan. The titular hero, Kerek-Kirves-Khemere-mergen, turns into a bird and flies to his father's court to spiy on him, and each time learns of fantastical objects. The first time, it is about an iron red deer with a spot on the forehead; he eventually kills the large iron deer and uses its hide as cover for his and his mother's yurt. Next, the khan claims that, if the hunter is really his son, he shall have a horse and a weapon made by his own ironsmiths ("долонарык-дархан") or from a person named Толонъ Арыкъ Дархана ("Tolon-Arik-Darkhana"). Lastly, he tells his ambassadors about the daughter of a creature named Убиртых-Хормозда (Ubirtykh-Khormozda), a maiden called Тэмэнъ ногонъ тэнгэрлеръ кызу ("Temen nogon tengerler kizu"), whom the boy should have for bride. Kerek-Kirves-Khemere-mergen returns home and learns from a helpful old lady that the maiden's father is a three-headed creature, and that his father has tried to get her as his wife. He kills the monster and prepares to enter Temen nogon's hut, but his horse warns him that she has special clothes that allow her to fly, so Kerek-Kirves-Khemere-mergen shall first block all entrances of the hut. He captures Temen nogon, and she consents to be his wife, but first he has to find three horses from beyond the boiling sea. He gets the horses; Temen nogon marries him and goes with him to his mother's yurt. After the khan learns of his son's exploits, he wants to invite him to his own yurt. However, Kerek-Kirves-Khemere-mergen declines his father's invitation, remembering his mother's ordeal, and invites the kahn to his yurt, made of the skin of the iron deer. The khan agrees to go to his son's yurt, but first his son has to get a tusk from a giant creature, the khan's father's lost sword, a net from the bottom of the sea, and the khan's great-grandfather furcoat in the underworld. Down in the underworld, Kerek-Kirves-Khemere-mergen gets the furcoat from underworld deity Erlik khan, who explains that, as soon as the khan wears it, the khan will be led straight to the underworld. This tale was later identified as coming from a Soyot source.

Torghut people
He has a hound named Khasar, which he sets lose one day and follow its trail. He reaches a large house; inside, a mother and her three daughters. He spies on their conversation: the elder sister promises that, if she marries Budjin-Dava-Khan, she will prepare a 9 course meal for 500 people with a single egg; the middle sister that, with the wool of a single she-goat, she can weave a carpet large enough for the Khan and his retinue, and the youngest promises to bear him a son of gold and a girl of silver. The Khan decides to marry all three women. The elder sisters fulfill their boasts and become co-wives of the khan and conspire with the other 500 wives to replace the khan's children with puppies. They seek the services of Цок-Тырыл тушмыла (Tsok-Tyryl tushmyla), who places the twins in a golden box, in a silver box, in a copper box, in an iron box, in a wooden box and wraps it in a leather bag. The boxes float downstream and are found by a fishing couple. After 11 years, the fisherman dies, but asks the golden boy to visit his grave one night. The boy goes and gains a mighty gray horse, equipped wih weapons and armor. He eventually meets Budjin-Dava-Khan, who notices the boy's extraordinariness. The eldest khatun, named Mani-Dara, goes to the twins' house and convinces the silver girl to seek a branch of the tree saikhan-saglar (guarded by three many-headed Mangyt-khais) and a maiden named Saikhan-Sarane, daughter of Zandan-tengir, as a wife for her brother. Saikhan-Sarane restores petrified people to life, and resurrects the twins' mother.

Relation to other tales
In a late-19th century article, Grigory Potanin argued that an Asian version of the Epic of King Gesar might have had elements that appear in these tales: Geser's father, a king named Гумен-хан (Gumen-Khan) listens to the promises of three sisters; he marries the third sister, who promises to bear him a hero named Geser. However, her sisters replace the boy for an animal and the abandon the child (Gesar) in the lake. Potanin also saw a parallel to a Tibetan tale with a very similar narrative from the Norwu-preng'va/Erdeniin Tobchi.

Footnotes

References 

Asian fairy tales
Asian folklore
Mongolian literature
Fictional kings
Fictional queens
Child abandonment
ATU 700-749